Herwig Reiter (born 26 June 1941, in Waidhofen an der Thaya) is an Austrian composer.

Discography
 Reiter: Es ist Feuer unter der Erde; Gesang der Engel

References

External links
  herwigreiter.com

Male conductors (music)
Austrian male composers
Austrian composers
1941 births
Living people
21st-century Austrian conductors (music)
21st-century male musicians